The name Nanmadol has been used to name four tropical cyclones in the northwestern Pacific Ocean. The name was contributed by Micronesia and refers to the Nan Madol archaeological site on Pohnpei.

 Typhoon Nanmadol (2004) (T0427, 30W, Yoyong) – struck the Philippines and Taiwan
 Typhoon Nanmadol (2011) (T1111, 14W, Mina) –  struck the Philippines, Taiwan and China
 Tropical Storm Nanmadol (2017) (T1703, 05W, Emong) – struck Japan
 Typhoon Nanmadol (2022) (T2214, 16W, Josie) – Category 4 super typhoon, struck Japan

Pacific typhoon set index articles